WVTT-CD, virtual channel 34 (VHF digital channel 11), is a low-powered, Class A television station serving the Twin Tiers that is licensed to Olean, New York. The station is owned by HC2 Holdings. The station's transmitter is located on Warner Hill Rd. in South Wales.

History
WVTT-CD first signed on March 7, 1986 as W20AB on channel 20 by Choice Olean Television, Inc. and was affiliated with the American Christian Television System (ACTS) and Tempo Television. The station was the first station to broadcast from the city, and the first television station in the Southern Tier of Western New York to prove to be commercially viable; WNYP-TV (channel 26), an earlier effort based in Jamestown, failed after only three years in the late 1960s and was passed on to a religious broadcaster.

Channel 20 was broadcast from the roof of the Palace Theater building in downtown Olean, but its signal was not well received outside of the city proper. The station acquired channel 25 (known then as W25AK) on August 24, 1987 as a repeater of the channel 20 signal, and signed on the air on April 12, 1989. The Palace Theater building was demolished in 1998 causing the channel 20 signal to go dark; its license, however, remains active . Channel 25 became the primary channel for the station and changed its call sign to WONS-LP (Olean's News Source) on March 8, 1999, gaining the shared UPN affiliation with Buffalo station WNGS (channel 67). The new UPN 25 held on to its affiliation until WNGS was added to the Olean-area cable line-up. WONS-LP later began to carry programming from the Urban America Television Network and Shop at Home Network, as well as a small share of local content. WONS-LP has also had past affiliations with Family Net, America One Network (A1), the American Independent Network (AIN), and Network One. The station was also among the initial affiliates of Main Street TV, the forerunner of America One. In 2006, Urban America and Shop at Home both ceased operations. The channel was then affiliated with The Sportsman Channel until that network moved exclusively to cable in 2009. America One Television Network once again lists the station as one of their affiliates. That network merged with Youtoo TV in 2015.

WONS-LP's operations were taken over by Colonial Radio Group, owners of WBYB, WXMT and WVTT, in October 2011. The call sign was changed to WVTT-CA (matching Colonial's talk radio station) in February 2012. On April 29, 2013, Colonial ended its involvement with the station, but the two stations would share control of the WVTT calls until Colonial relinquished them in 2018. In June 2013, Choice Tower Rentals announced the sale of WVTT-CA, as well as the still-active W20AB license, to Milachi Media (an alias for William and Paige Christian, who also own stakes in Waypoint Media; the deal will put the station under common ownership with WYDC (channel 48) and WJKP-LD (channel 39) in Corning, WBGT-CD (channel 46) in Rochester, and several Elmira/Corning radio stations. (Waypoint later transferred the license to another shell company, "Novia Communications," then to "Woodland Communications," both of which have the same principal owners.) In 2014, the company acquired radio stations WMXO, WOEN, WGGO and WQRS in Cattaraugus County, making the four stations sister stations to WVTT-CA.

On December 17, 2014, the station was licensed for digital operation, changing its call sign to WVTT-CD. Its channel 34 was previously used by WNYO-TV prior to the full-power analog shutdown in 2009;  As part of the change, WVTT's broadcast transmitter was relocated from Olean to its current location on the Machias/Yorkshire town line, a considerable distance from Olean with a much broader signal capable of covering most of Western New York; it remains licensed to Olean. To accommodate the move, WVTT's virtual channel changed from 25 to 34, as the move brought the signal within range of CBLFT, also on channel 25 out of Toronto. W20AB's license was given the call sign WWHC-LP, with the signal now operating using WVTT's former broadcast area mostly confined to the city of Olean. As of 2020, both WVTT and WWHC are off the air; construction permit applications were filed to move WWHC to WVTT's current location and move WVTT to the current WGRZ tower in South Wales, New York, with intent to return both stations to air in August.

In 2017, WVTT accepted an offer of over $9,000,000 to move to the high-VHF spectrum, down from its UHF position, in the FCC's spectrum incentive auction. When the station moves on March 13, 2020, it will occupy channel 11. (Channel 34 will be taken over by ABC affiliate WKBW-TV (channel 7), which is moving down the dial from 38.) The station also changed affiliations to This TV, some time after March 2017 (after WBBZ-DT2 had dropped the affiliation); This TV affiliated with WBXZ-LP (channel 56) on its twelfth digital subchannel in August 2019. Decades and Movies!, two Weigel Broadcasting subchannels, were added on June 1, 2018. Both moved to WBBZ (which carries Weigel's main network MeTV) on July 1, 2020.

In 2018, the WWHC license was traded to DTV America Corporation in exchange for ABC affiliate WPBY-LD (channel 35) in Lafayette, Indiana. On August 6, DTV America's parent company HC2 Holdings purchased the WVTT-CD license.

Local programming
Despite existing in one of the smallest markets in the United States (Nielsen does not even recognize it as a separate designated market area, instead listing it as a subset of the Buffalo market) and the lack of a major network affiliation, channels 20 and 34 (formerly 25) have a long history of local programming. The station has, at various times in its history, carried a local newscast and several other local programs, most of which were public affairs and interview shows.

In-house productions (1986 to 1990)
The station produced and aired a number of locally produced programs. The original local programs were all produced in-house by the station.

"The Ranger Ron Show" was a daily children's program starring Ron Koblinger, which featured cartoons and short subject features along with location appearances. One weekly feature was "Jeffrey's Neighborhood", a puppet show sponsored by a local church. Various characters regularly visited with Ranger Ron played by different employees of the station. The program aired through 1988.

"In Your Own Backyard" began broadcasting in the winter of 1986 and was originally hosted by Valerie Tigh. It was a magazine type show highlighting various attractions and events in the greater Olean area. It was later co hosted by Sheila Cleveland. Val Tigh was replaced by news director Ron Nicholas and the show's name was changed to "20/20 Vision". After the departure of Sheila Cleveland in 1988, Ron Nicholas assumed sole hosting duties and the name was changed once again to "Magazine 20". The show was discontinued in 1989.

"Overview" (later known as "Overview with Ron Nicholas") was an interview talk show format hosted by news director Ron Nicholas. The show featured interviews with local celebrities and politicians and nationally known personalities including Jean Shepard of A Christmas Story and Larry Linville who played Frank Burns on M*A*S*H.

"Sports Scene" was a local sports highlights program produced and hosted by sports director Blaise O'Connor.  The show covered local high school and college sports, local national sports teams, Little League baseball and local softball leagues. The show was later produced by EMTV.

"On Stage" hosted by Jean Davis and produced by Dana Kopec featured interviews and performances by local music acts. It aired from summer of 1988 to summer 1989.

"Video Review" critiqued new home video releases and originally hosted by Ron Nicholas and Tony Wenke. Wenke was replaced by Jean Davis for a short period before the show was discontinued.

News program – "Olean to Date" hosted by Rob Fair and Blaise O'Connor was a daily news program covering events and public interest stories in the greater Olean area.  It was on the air for a few months in 1989.

"The Tom Chapman Show" - From November 1989 to March 1990, St. Bonaventure University men's basketball coach Tom Chapman co-hosted "The Tom Chapman Show" along with local radio personality Francis Tomasino. The weekly show analyzed previous games and previewed upcoming contests. Along with airing on TV20, it also was televised by local cable sports channels in the Philadelphia and southern New Jersey areas as part of their Atlantic 10 Conference programming. The show was also produced in 1990-91 by EMTV. (Since that time, the coach's show, known as "The Mark Schmidt Show" as of 2012, has been carried only on radio; as of 2012 it is carried on WPIG with Gary Nease as host.)

The station also carried the Olean Common Council meetings each week on a one-day tape delay.

Enchanted Mountain TV (1990 to 1994)
The station discontinued producing its own local productions in late 1990. Local programming was then produced by Enchanted Mountain Television (EMTV), a local television production company, exclusively for channel 20.

"Game of the Week" – EMTV aired local sports games on a tape delay featuring high school football, Little League baseball, local softball leagues, St. Bonaventure University basketball and Alfred University football.

"The 12th Ward" – EMTV continued to air the Olean Common Council meetings on tape delay. Following each meeting "The 12th Ward" was aired, a live phone-in talk show hosted by Joseph Weatherell and featured one or two Olean alderpersons to discuss local politics and answer viewers questions. When Time-Warner Cable assumed coverage of the council meetings as per their franchise agreement with the city, EMTV discontinued airing the meetings.

"It's Your Turn" – When EMTV stopped airing the Common Council meetings, "The 12th Ward" was changed to "It's Your Turn", an open line talk show hosted by Don Kellogg. The program topics were chosen by the viewers, giving the public a vehicle to bring their concerns to light.

"Wrangler's Round-up" hosted by local radio personality Ron Weston.  The show featured the latest country music videos and also interviews with popular performers, including Kitty Wells. The show was later changed to "Country View" and hosted by radio personality Peggy Banks.

"Twin Tiers Today" and "Twin Tiers Live" was a local news cast and interview show hosted by Ron Weston and Don Kellogg with sports by Blaise O'Connor.  The morning program, "Twin Tiers Live" was an hour-long news and interview program and "Twin Tiers Today" was a live half-hour news cast at 5:00pm and repeated at 7:00pm.

"The 19th Hole" – visited and showcased local golf courses. Hosted by Don McLean, the show ran for one season on EMTV. The show was resurrected two years later and produced by JW Productions and McLean Communications.

"The Tom Chapman Show" was produced by EMTV for one season (90-91) under the assistance of the media department of St. Bonaventure University.

JW Productions (1994 to 2000)
EMTV ceased operations in 1994. Programming for W25AK/WONS-LP was continued by JW Productions until August 2000.

"The 19th Hole" hosted by Don McLean. One season produced by JW Productions in cooperation with McLean Communications in 1996.

"WONS News" anchored by news director Dick Say with Blaise O'Connor covering sports.

"Overview" – interview format talk show hosted by Dick Say featuring local personalities and politicians.

All-network era (2000 to 2011)
After August 2000, and before Colonial took over operations of the station, local programming on WONS-LP/WVTT-CA was minimal, with the station relying primarily on network shows.

Colonial Media Group (2011 to 2013)

WVTT-CA resumed local newscasts, including a simulcast of WVTT-FM's morning show and an evening newscast, from October 7, 2011 until April 29, 2013. WVTT-CA operated a staff of approximately a half-dozen reporters but did not have a weather or sports department, although Blaise O'Connor returned to the station for a short time (the only weather forecasts WVTT-CA used were hastily tacked on, rip-and-read radio style, to the end of each evening newscast; its morning newscast forecasts were phoned in by radio meteorologist Jim Renaldi, who continues to forecast for WVTT-FM). The evening newscast was, for its entire run under Colonial stewardship, anchored by Alexa Olson and Colonial CEO Jeff Andrulonis. The morning newscast was initially hosted by area radio veterans Michael Baldwin and Casey Hill, and later by former WESB morning host Josh Hatcher.

Vision Communications (2014 to 2018)
No local programming of note originated from WVTT-CD during Vision Communications' ownership of the station.

HC2/DTV America (2018 to present)
HC2 Holdings stations act mainly as pass-through affiliates with no local programming.

Digital channels
The station's digital signal is multiplexed:

References

External links 

Twin Tiers News Blog - orphaned WVTT news blog from Colonial's stewardship

Television channels and stations established in 1986
Cattaraugus County, New York
VTT-CD
Low-power television stations in the United States
Decades (TV network) affiliates